PharmEasy is an Indian e-pharmacy company that sells medicines, diagnostics and telehealth online.

History 
The company was founded in 2015 by Dharmil Sheth and Dhaval Shah in Mumbai with the initial seed funding provided by their parents. The company wanted to expand beyond the Mumbai market but there online pharmacies were illegal and many traditional pharmacies and the Chemist Association organised and participated in a street protest. Despite the protests, investors showed interest and the company received their Series A funding. In 2020, PharmEasy merged with API Holding, the parent company. In 2021, the company was reported to be acquiring Thyrocare.

Competition 
There are a number of other e-pharmacy companies including Netmeds (which was acquired by Reliance), 1 mg (acquired by Tata) and Amazon pharmacy.The Ken questioned the company's positioning as a unified healthtech player and referred to the company's story as more confusing than convincing.

Medlife PharmEasy merger protests 
In 2020,  the two organizations were in merger talks which came to the attention of the Competition Commission of India (CCI) who were required to approve of the merger. The merger was protested by The South Chemist and Distributors Association (SCDA) who objected that such a merger should to be rejected as sales of medicines online was illegal in India. The online sales of medicines was later regulated and the merger was completed in 2021.

PharmEasy advertising criticism 
Members of the Hindu Religion criticized one of the company's advertisements and said that it was disrespectful to use religious sentiments were hurt for the sake of marketing and sales. The advertisement in question showed Lakshman being struck and Ram needing Sanjeevani and asking who will bring Sanjeevani from such a long distance. Two staff members of PharmEasy come on a scooter and delivers the medicine.

References 

Indian companies established in 2015
Retail companies established in 2015
Internet properties established in 2015
E-commerce
Companies based in Mumbai